Sarah Moss (born 1975) is an English writer and academic. She has published six novels, as well as a number of non-fiction works and academic texts. Her work has been nominated three times for the Wellcome Book Prize. She was appointed Assistant Professor of Creative Writing at University College Dublin's School of English, Drama and Film in the Republic of Ireland with effect from September 2020.

Biography
Sarah Moss was born in Glasgow, Scotland, and at the age of two moved with her family to Manchester, where she lived until at the age of 18, when she went to study at the University of Oxford. During the ten years she spent in Oxford, she earned a BA, Master of Studies and D.Phil in English Literature, and then held a postdoctoral research fellowship. From 2004 to 2009 she was a lecturer at the University of Kent. Following the publication in 2009 of her first novel, Cold Earth, Moss went to teach for a year at the University of Iceland. She then took up a post as Senior Lecturer in Literature and Place at Exeter University's Penryn Campus in Cornwall, and subsequently moved to the University of Warwick, becoming Director of the Warwick Writing Programme, teaching creative writing.

Awards
Moss's 2011 novel Night Waking won the Fiction Uncovered Prize. Her non-fiction book Names for the Sea: Strangers in Iceland was shortlisted for the Royal Society of Literature's Ondaatje Prize in 2013. In 2015 her novel Bodies of Light was shortlisted for the Wellcome Book Prize, and her novels Signs for Lost Children and The Tidal Zone were also shortlisted for the same award in 2016 and 2017 respectively. Her 2018 novel Ghost Wall was shortlisted for the Ondaatje Prize and the Polari Prize, and was longlisted for the 2019 Women's Prize for Fiction.

Bibliography

Novels

Cold Earth (Granta, 2009)
Night Waking (Granta, 2011)
Bodies of Light (Granta, 2014)
Signs for Lost Children (Granta, 2015)
The Tidal Zone (Granta, 2016)
Ghost Wall (Granta, 2018)
Summerwater (Pan Macmillan, 2020)
The Fell (Pan Macmillan, 2021)

Non-fiction

 The Frozen Ship (2006)
 Scott’s Last Biscuit: the literature of polar exploration (2006)
 Spilling the Beans: reading, writing, eating and cooking in British women’s fiction 1770 – 1830
 Chocolate: A Global History (2009)
 Names for the Sea: Strangers in Iceland (Granta, 2012)

Critical studies and reviews of Moss' work

Summerwater
 
———————
Notes

References

External links
 Sarah Moss

1975 births
Living people
English women novelists
21st-century English novelists
21st-century English women writers
Academics of the University of Warwick
Academics of University College Dublin
Alumni of the University of Oxford
Academics of the University of Kent
Academic staff of the University of Iceland
Academics of the University of Exeter
English academics of English literature